Crystal Machine is a combination studio/live album by Tim Blake, recorded and released in 1977 on Egg Records, LP (900545).

Track listing 
All tracks composed by Tim Blake
"Midnight" [7:40]
"Metro/Logic" [8:07]
"Last Ride of the Boogie Child" [9:43]
"Synthese Intemporel" [19:30]
"Crystal Presence" [3:11]

Personnel
Tim Blake - Instruments: EMS Synthis A, Minimoog, Elka Rhapsody, effects [EMS Frequency Shifter, MXR Flanger, Sony TC Tape Deck Echo, Sony Mix 12], production

References 

1977 debut albums
Tim Blake albums